Floyd Gwen Cooper (born December 13, 1948) is an American former gridiron football player. He played college football at the end position for the UCLA Bruins from 1967 to 1969. During the 1969 season, he caught 38 passes for 734 yards and nine touchdowns. He was selected by the AP, UPI, and Pac-8 coaches as a first-team player on the 1969 All-Pacific Coast football team. He also played professional football in the Canadian Football League (CFL) for the Ottawa Rough Riders in 1970.

References

1948 births
Living people
American football ends
American players of Canadian football
Ottawa Rough Riders players
UCLA Bruins football players
Sportspeople from Los Angeles County, California
Sportspeople from Wichita, Kansas
Players of American football from California